Laghuu is a Loloish language spoken in northwestern Vietnam.

Edmondson considers Laghuu to be related to but not part of the Yi language complex of China. Jamin Pelkey (2011) considers Laghuu to be a Southeastern Loloish language.

Distribution
Laghuu is spoken in the following locations by a total of about 1,000 people (Edmondson 1999 & 2002).

Lào Cai Province
Văn Bàn District
Bảo Thắng District
Bát Xát District
A Lù
Sa Pa Town
Nậm Sài
Cam Đường (near Lào Cai city)
Yên Bái Province
Văn Yên
Sơn La Province
Thuần Giáo

The Vietnam, Laghuu speakers are officially classified as part of the Phù Lá ethnic group. Some Laghuu are known as "Black Phu La," and others as "Flowery Phu La."

Phonology

Consonants 
Laghuu has the following consonants.

Vowels
Laghuu has the following vowels.

Tones 
Laghu has five tones:
 high 
 high-mid 
 low-mid 
 low-rising 
 low-falling

Notes

References 
Edmondson, J. A., & Ziwo, L. (1999).  "Laghuu or Xá Phó, A New Language of the Yi Group," Linguistics of the Tibeto-Burman Area 22/1:1-10.
Edmondson, Jerold A. (2002). "The Central and Southern Loloish Languages of Vietnam". Proceedings of the Twenty-Eighth Annual Meeting of the Berkeley Linguistics Society: Special Session on Tibeto-Burman and Southeast Asian Linguistics (2002), pp. 1–13.
Nguyễn Văn Huy (1975). "Bước đầu tim hiểu mới quan hệ tộc người giữa hai nhóm Phù Lá và Xá Phó". In, Ủy ban khoa học xã hội Việt Nam: Viện dân tộc học. Về vấn đề xác định thánh phần các dân tộc thiểu số ở miền bắc Việt Nam, 415-428. Hà Nội: Nhà xuất bản khoa học xã hội.
http://ling.uta.edu/jerry/vietTB1.pdf
https://web.archive.org/web/20100627045649/http://ling.uta.edu/~jerry/tbv.pdf

Loloish languages
Languages of Vietnam